Mundy's Mill High School is a public school in the Clayton County Public Schools (CCPS) system in Jonesboro, Georgia, United States. The school's teams compete as the Tigers.

References

External links
 Main site

Public high schools in Georgia (U.S. state)
Schools in Clayton County, Georgia